Jeroen Verkennis (born 20 December 1998) is a Dutch football player who plays as a right back for RKSV Wittenhorst.

Club career
He made his professional debut in the Eerste Divisie for Helmond Sport on 1 April 2016 in a game against FC Dordrecht.

References

External links
 

1998 births
Living people
Dutch footballers
Association football fullbacks
Helmond Sport players
Eerste Divisie players
People from Nuenen, Gerwen en Nederwetten
Footballers from North Brabant